Reverend John Hancock may refer to:

John Hancock Sr. (1671–1752), colonial American clergyman and paternal grandfather of American politician John Hancock
John Hancock Jr. (1702–1744), colonial American clergyman and father of American politician John Hancock
Rev. John Hancock House, Cider Mill and Cemetery, Florham Park, New Jersey, listed on the National Register of Historic Places listings in Morris County, New Jersey

See also
John Hancock (disambiguation)